Grant Showbiz (real name Grant Cunliffe) is a British record producer principally known for his work with The Fall, The Smiths, and Billy Bragg plus as an artist in his own right with Moodswings.  He has worked on more albums by both The Fall (15) & Billy Bragg (14) than any other producer, and continues to work with Bragg. Showbiz has been awarded Gold Records for The Smiths' Rank, Billy Bragg's Don't Try This At Home and The Wilco/Bragg collaboration Mermaid Vol.1, and received Grammy nominations for both Mermaid Avenue Vols 1 & 2.

Career
Showbiz started as a soundman for anarcho-hippypunks Here & Now in 1976. Showbiz ran the sound and stage at many free festivals such as Windsor and Stonehenge. Stamping his personality on proceedings, using a microphone plugged into the soundboard, he would often amiably harangue those onstage to get on with it, or off, as circumstances might merit. He quickly forged links with the punk scene, producing albums for Alternative TV & The Fall. In 1979 he set up the Ladbroke Grove-based Street-Level Studio with Kif Kif (ex drummer of Here & Now) & José Gross (ex keyboard player from Here & Now, guitarist from Blank Space and The Real Imitations), going on to record a swathe of bands including The Fall, Alternative TV, Mark Perrys' Good Missionaries, The Door And The Window, 012, World Domination Enterprises, The Mob, Impossible Dreamers, The Astronauts, Blyth Power, Brian Brain, The Petticoats, Androids Of Mu, The Instant Automatons & Take It - many released on the associated pioneering DIY record label Fuck Off Records. At this time Showbiz also began making music himself, playing bass in Blue Midnight (who he continues to record & play live with).

Through connections with Rough Trade Showbiz became The Smiths live sound engineer, working with them from their fifth gig until their last gig in 1986. He produced their live album  Rank and recorded their last ever tracks "Work Is a Four Letter Word" and "I Keep Mine Hidden". He filmed a backstage video Reel Around the Fountain of their 1984 UK tour and recorded most of their live shows.

From 1989, Showbiz was member of studio-based band Moodswings until their 2002 album Horizontal.

Showbiz continues to tour as sound engineer for Billy Bragg.

Personal life
He is married to Frank Chickens frontwoman Kazuko Hohki.

Discography

Blue Midnight

Albums
Love Not Devotion
Le Bal Des Idiots
Blue Midnight
Father Of Apples
Balance

Singles
Street-Level E.P.
Just A Dream

Billy Bragg

Albums
The Internationale
Don't Try This At Home
William Bloke
Bloke On Bloke
Mermaid Avenue Vol 1 (with Wilco & Natalie Merchant)
Reaching To The Converted
Mermaid Avenue Vol 2 (with Wilco)
Bill's Bargains
Must I Paint You A Picture? (The Essential Billy Bragg)
England Half English
Live At the Barbican
Boxsets Vol 12
Mr Love & Justice
Pressure Drop

Singles
The Boy Done Good
Take Down The Union Jack
Johnny Clash

The Fall

Albums
Dragnet (1979)
Totales' Turns	(1980)
Grotesque (1980)
Slates (1981)
A Part Of America Therein (1982)
Hex Enduction Hour (1982)
The Frenz Experiment (1988)
Shiftwork (1991)
Twenty Seven Points (1995)
The Legendary Chaos Tapes (1996)
The Unutterable(2000)
Country On The Click - The Real New Fall LP   (2003)
Live At Deeply Vale (2005)
Imperial Wax Solvent (2008)
Last Night At The Palais  (2009)
Re-Mit (2013)

Singles
There's A Ghost In My House (1987)
Hi Tension Line (1990)
The Chiselers (1996)

The Smiths

Album
Rank (1988)

B sides
Nowhere Fast
Stretch Out And Wait
Shakespeare's Sister
Meat Is Murder
Work Is A Four Letter Word
I Keep Mine Hidden

Moodswings

Albums
Moodfood
Live At Leeds
Psychedelicatessen

References

External links 
 

British record producers
Living people
Place of birth missing (living people)
Year of birth missing (living people)